Markandeya Hill is near the town of Vokkaleri in Kolar District of Karnataka State. It is named after the sage Markandeya. There is a temple and also a reservoir of the same name in Kolar District.

External links 

Hills of Karnataka
Geography of Kolar district
Tourist attractions in Kolar district